DeMarcus Jerrell Curry (born April 30, 1975) is a former American football tackle. He played for the Tampa Bay Buccaneers in 1999, 2000 and 2001.

References

1975 births
Living people
American football offensive tackles
Auburn Tigers football players
Tampa Bay Buccaneers players
Players of American football from Columbus, Georgia